Tutufa tenuigranosa is a species of sea snail, a marine gastropod mollusk in the family Bursidae, the frog shells.

Description
(Original description) The species might perhaps be regarded as a sculptured form of Tutufa bardeyi (F.P. Jousseaume, 1881). The aperture, columellar callus, and outer lip are entirely white. The columella is finely li above and more strongly anteriorly. 
The peculiarity of this species is the much finer granulation of the surface. The largest specimen is 193 mm in length.

Distribution
This marine species occurs off the Philippines, India and in the South China Sea.

References

 Steyn, D. G.; Lussi, M. (2005). Offshore Shells of Southern Africa: A pictorial guide to more than 750 Gastropods. Published by the authors. pp. i–vi, 1–289.
 Castelin, M., Lorion, J., Brisset, J., Cruaud, C., Maestrati, P., Utge, J. & Samadi, S., 2012. Speciation patterns in gastropods with long-lived larvae from deep-sea seamounts. Molecular Ecology 21: 4828-4853

External links
 Smith, E. A. (1914). Note on Bursa (Tutufa) rubeta (Bolton) = Triton lampas (Lamarck et auct.). Journal of Conchology. 14: 226–231, pl. 4

Bursidae
Gastropods described in 1914